Kaitlyn Narvaza, better known as instantmiso (written only with lowercase letters), is an American comics creator of Filipino ancestry (on her grandmother's side). She is a WEBTOON original creator since 2015, when launched the webcomic Where Tangents Meet. After this one, she published Siren's Lament, which was a great success with more than 430 million views, followed by Eaternal Nocturnal.

In 2017, instantmiso won Ringo Awards for Fan Favorite New Talent.

Awards and nominations

References

Webtoon creators
American comics creators